Marco Antonio Figueroa Montero (born 21 February 1962) is a Chilean former footballer, currently manager for Nicaragua. He is commonly known as "El Fantasma" (Spanish word: "The phantom"). Figueroa played as a striker and spent the majority of his playing career at Mexico, after retiring in 1998, at the Chilean powerhouse Universidad Católica, aged 36.

Club career
Figueroa is considered an idol of Morelia after playing for the club between 1986 and 1990. He and his Chilean fellows Juan Carlos Vera and Ángel Bustos are well remembered as a prolific attacking trident.

Coaching career 

In January 2001, he debuted as head coach at the Guatemalan successful club Comunicaciones, signing the next season for Atlético Celaya of the Liga de Ascenso, in where Figueroa had two spells, after of direct to Salamanca F.C. of the same country in the 2003 season. Three years later, with adobe steps at Querétaro and UAG Tecos, in September 2006, he signed a contract with Monarcas Morelia, his old club when was player, team in where also was an historic goalscorer during the 1980s and 90s.

Figueroa came back to his homeland in July 2008 signing for Cobreloa, another old club in his career, of this form returning to his country after ten years out in Mexico and Guatemala. After a successful season at the team of Calama, reaching the Clausura Tournament semi–finals, in December of that year, he reached an agreement with Universidad Católica for direct to that team in the next season. At Católica, Figueroa was runner–up in the 2009 Clausura Tournament, after a regular season in the last semester, despite reaching the semi–finals of the Apertura Tournament, being also named as the coach of the year according to El Gráfico. The next season, after a regular campaign with Católica in the first part of the league tournament and in the 2010 Copa Libertadores, he was fired of the club, but signed months later for O'Higgins.

On 11 April 2011, Figueroa signed a contract with the Primera B side Everton, replacing to Diego Osella, because the bad results that the Argentine coach reached in the first weeks of the Apertura Tournament of that division. At the club based in Viña del Mar, he was champion of the Clausura Tournament of that level, but not achieved the promotion, after of loss against Unión San Felipe and Rangers. The next season, he was fired from the club.

On 25 September 2018, Figueroa was re-appointed as head coach for O'Higgins.

Honours

Player
Cobreloa
 Primera División de Chile (1): 1992

Individual
 Primera División de Chile Top–scorer (1): 1993
 Monarcas Morelia all-time top scorer (130 goals)

Manager
Universidad Católica
 Torneo Clausura (1): Runner–up 2009

Everton
 Primera B (1): 2011 Apertura
 Promotion playoffs (1): Runner-up 2011

Individual
 ANFP Golden Ball (1): Best coach 2009

References

External links
 

1962 births
Living people
People from San Felipe, Chile
Chilean footballers
Chile international footballers
Chilean expatriate footballers
Association football forwards
Unión La Calera footballers
Everton de Viña del Mar footballers
Atlético Morelia players
Club América footballers
Cobreloa footballers
Atlético Celaya footballers
Club Deportivo Universidad Católica footballers
Primera B de Chile players
Chilean Primera División players
Liga MX players
Expatriate footballers in Mexico
Chilean expatriate sportspeople in Mexico
Footballers at the 1984 Summer Olympics
Olympic footballers of Chile
1993 Copa América players
Chilean football managers
Chilean expatriate football managers
Comunicaciones F.C. managers
Chiapas F.C. managers
Club Celaya managers
Querétaro F.C. managers
Tecos F.C. managers
Atlético Morelia managers
Cobreloa managers
Club Deportivo Universidad Católica managers
O'Higgins F.C. managers
Everton de Viña del Mar managers
Unión San Felipe managers
Universidad de Chile managers
San Marcos de Arica managers
Nicaragua national football team managers
Chilean Primera División managers
Primera B de Chile managers
Liga MX managers
Expatriate football managers in Mexico
Expatriate football managers in Guatemala
Chilean expatriate sportspeople in Guatemala
Expatriate football managers in Nicaragua
Chilean expatriate sportspeople in Nicaragua